The 1936 Coupe de France Final was a football match held at Stade Olympique Yves-du-Manoir, Colombes on 3 May 1936, that saw RC Paris defeat FCO Charleville 1–0 thanks to a goal by Roger Couard.

Match details

External links
 Coupe de France results at Rec.Sport.Soccer Statistics Foundation
 Report on French federation site

Coupe
1936
Coupe De France Final 1936
Sport in Hauts-de-Seine
Coupe de France Final
Coupe de France Final